Constantin Daicoviciu (until 1973 Căvăran) is a commune in Caraș-Severin County, western Romania with a population of 2,946 people. It is composed of six villages: Constantin Daicoviciu, Maciova (Mácsova), Mâtnicu Mare (Nagymutnok), Peștere (Krassóbarlang), Prisaca (Gyepesfalu) and Zăgujeni (Zaguzsén). It is situated in the historical region of Banat.

Constantin Daicoviciu is situated on the Căile Ferate Române Line 900, which runs from Bucharest to Jimbolia.

Natives
 Constantin Daicoviciu (1898–1973), historian and archaeologist, namesake of the present-day commune
 Otto Roth (1884–1956), lawyer and journalist, leader of the Banat Republic

References

Communes in Caraș-Severin County
Localities in Romanian Banat